"That's a No No" is a song written by Ben Peters. It was recorded by American country music artist Lynn Anderson and released as a single in July 1969 via Chart Records.

Background and release
"That's a No No" was recorded at the RCA Victor Studio in May 1969, located in Nashville, Tennessee. The sessions was produced by Slim Williamson, Anderson's producer while recording for the Chart label.

"That's a No No" reached number 2 on the Billboard Hot Country Singles chart in 1969. It was Anderson's seventh major hit single as a recording artist. It also became a major hit on the Canadian RPM Country Songs chart, reaching number two in 1969. The song was issued on Anderson's 1969 studio album, At Home with Lynn.

Track listings 
7" vinyl single
 "That's a No No" – 2:00
 "If Silence Is Golden" – 2:30

Chart performance

References

1969 singles
1969 songs
Lynn Anderson songs
Songs written by Ben Peters